Kryštof is a Czech pop rock band founded in 1994 in Havířov by Richard Krajčo, Nikolaj Arichtev, Jaroslav Blahut, Biser Arichtev, and Pavel Studník. As of 2023, they have released nine studio albums, one EP, three live albums, one remix album, and two compilations.

In 2006, Kryštof won their first Anděl Award and have since received twelve more. In 2013, they won a Český slavík award for Group of the Year.

Band members
Current
 Richard Krajčo – vocals, guitar
 Nikos Petros Kuluris – saxophone, clarinet
 Nikolaj Atanasov Arichtev – bass guitar
 Jakub Dominik – drums
 Evžen Hofmann – guitar
 Ondřej Kyjonka – trombone, keyboards
 Nikolas Grigoriadis – trumpet

Past
 Pavel Studník – guitar
 Biser Arichtev – guitar
 Jaroslav Blahut – drums
 Marc Minarich – keyboards
 Aleš Konieczny – saxophone

Discography

Studio albums
 Magnetické pole (2001)
 V siločarách (2002)
 03 (2003)
 Mikrokosmos (2004)
 Rubikon (2006)
 Jeviště (2010)
 Inzerát (2012)
 Srdcebeat (2015)
 Halywůd (2021)

EPs
 Srdcebeat Remix (2015)

Live albums
 Ži(v)je (2005)
 'Kryštof v Opeře (2008)
 Kryštof na Strahově 2017 (2018)

Remix albums
 Rem-X-Y (2012)

Compilations
 Poločas (2007)
 25 (2017)

DVDs
 Ži(v)je (2005)
 Kryštof na Strahově 2017'' (2018)

Singles
 "Lolita" (2001)
 "Obchodník s deštěm" (2002)
 "Rubikon" (2006)
 "Plán" (2007)
 "Atentát" (2008)
 "Tak nějak málo tančím" (2008)
 "cyRáno" (2009)
 "Jeviště" (2010)
 "Ostravská Balada" (2010)
 "Inzerát" (2012)
 "Křídla z mýdla" (2012)
 "Čím víc vím" (2013)
 "Zatančím" (2013)
 "Cesta" (2013)
 "Srdcebeat" (2015)
 "Ty a já" (2015)
 "Invaze" (2015)
 "Každé ráno" (2015)
 "Tak pojď hledat břeh" (2016)
 "Šňůry" (2017)
 "Zůstaň tu se mnou" (2017)
 "Naviděnou" (2018)
 "Nesmím zapomenout" (2019)
 "Hvězdáři" (2019)
 "Hned teď" (2020)
 "Milan Baroš" (2020)
 "Vánoční" (2020)
 "Halywůd" (2021)
 "Do nebe se propadám" (2021)
 "Co bude pak" (2022)

References

External links
 

Czech pop music groups
Czech rock music groups
Musical groups established in 1994
1994 establishments in the Czech Republic